The Jiji Military History Park is a historical park in Jiji Township, Nantou County, Taiwan about the Republic of China Armed Forces.

Features
The park displays a set of fighter jet, airplane, battle tank, rocket launcher, amphibious tank etc.

Transportation
The park is accessible within walking distance East of Jiji Station of Taiwan Railways.

See also
 List of parks in Taiwan

References

Parks in Taiwan
Tourist attractions in Nantou County